Lee Li Lian (born 19 July 1978) is a Singaporean politician. A member of the opposition Workers' Party (WP), she was the Member of Parliament for Punggol East SMC between 2013 and 2015.

Lee made her political debut in the 2011 general election where she contested in Punggol East SMC but lost. She later served as the Member of Parliament (MP) representing Punggol East SMC between 2013 and 2015 after winning the 2013 by-election but lost her seat to Charles Chong in the 2015 general election by a narrow margin.

Career
Outside politics, Lee worked as a Business Development Executive at Clapper (S) Pte Ltd (2000–2003), a Financial Consultant for American International Assurance (2003–2005), a Broker with CIMB-GK Securities (2005–2006), a Recruitment Manager for Prudential Assurance (2006–2008) and a Senior Trainer at Great Eastern Life Assurance (2008–2013). Lee resigned from her job as a financial trainer to serve as a full-time MP following her victory in the Punggol East by-election.

Political career
Lee was the Workers' Party's Deputy Treasurer from 2008 to 2011, the party's Youth Wing President from 2011 to 2012 and the Deputy Webmaster from 2012 to 2014. Since 2014, she has been the Organising Secretary on the party's Executive Council. Prior to her election to parliament, she also served as a legislative assistant to Pritam Singh, who he was now the Secretary-General of the party since 2018, and as an MP of the Aljunied Group Representation Constituency (which the party first captured the constituency in the 2011 general election.

Lee made her debut in the political arena on the 2011 general election where she was fielded as a candidate representing the Punggol East SMC (a ward formerly part of the neighbouring Pasir Ris–Punggol GRC), where she was defeated to the governing People's Action Party (PAP) candidate, Michael Palmer (who was made as a Speaker of Parliament post-election), with 16,994 (54.54%) to 12,777 votes (41.01%) (a third candidate, Desmond Lim of the Singapore Democratic Alliance (SDA), received only 1,387 votes (4.45%)).

However, on 12 December 2012, Palmer resigned his Speaker and MP post citing that he had an extra-marital affair against a constituency director from Pasir Ris West division, eventually precipitated a by-election which would be held in January 2013. On the same day, then-Secretary General of WP, Low Thia Khiang announced the party candidacy, and would field Lee to contest the seat again in the forthcoming by-election.

At the close of the nomination (on 16 January), Lee faced a rare four-cornered contest between PAP's Koh Poh Koon (a colorectal surgeon who joined the party three months prior), the SDA's Lim, and a fourth candidate, the Reform Party's Secretary-General Kenneth Jeyaretnam. On 26 January, Lee won the election with 16,045 votes (54.50%), with her rivals Koh, Jeyaretnam and Lim, received 12,875 (43.73%), 353 (1.20%) and 168 votes (0.57%), respectively. This win marked the second time after the 1981 by-election the WP had captured another parliamentary seat after a by-election, and Lee was also the first female candidate to control a SMC. Upon her win, Lee told the media that her immediate priority as Member of Parliament would be to ensure the smooth handover of the Town Council from the ruling PAP. Lee was sworn in as a Member of Parliament on 4 February 2013.

In the 2015 General Election, Lee was announced as a candidate who would defend the constituency, and on 27 August, PAP revealed that six-term MP and Deputy Speaker Charles Chong would be the challenger. On 11 September, Lee was defeated in her re-election 48.24% to 51.76%, and thus returning Punggol East SMC to the PAP. Although she was offered a Non-Constituency MP (NCMP) position by-virtue for being the best-scoring losers of the election, Lee declined the offer, the first time someone had done so since 1984. It was later revealed that Daniel Goh, a candidate part of the Workers' Party team for the East Coast GRC, would replace Lee as the last NCMP seat, on 4 February 2016.

During the 2020 general election, Punggol East SMC was dissolved and was changed to Sengkang GRC which was won by the Worker's Party but she did not contest in the 2020 general election and was appointed as the Town Councillor of Sengkang Town Council.

Education
Lee attended Holy Innocents' High School and Ngee Ann Polytechnic before graduating from Curtin University in 2001.

Personal life
Lee is married to Koh Chee Koon, a telecommunications consultant. On 15 January 2014, it was announced that she is pregnant with her first child and on 1 July 2014, she gave birth to a baby girl.

References

External links
 Profile at Parliament of Singapore website
 Profile at Workers' Party website

Members of the Parliament of Singapore
Workers' Party (Singapore) politicians
Singaporean women in politics
Singaporean people of Teochew descent
Curtin University alumni
Ngee Ann Polytechnic alumni
1978 births
Living people